Birgitt Haas Must Be Killed (French: Il faut tuer Birgitt Haas) is a 1981 French-West German political thriller film directed by Laurent Heynemann and starring Philippe Noiret, Jean Rochefort and Lisa Kreuzer. It is based on the novel L'histoire de Birgitt Haas by Guy Teisseire.

Plot
Athanase, head of a top-secret counterintelligence group called "Hangar", is given the task of eliminating Birgitt Haas, a former German terrorist. A new ambitious member of the group, Colonna, suggests disguising the assassination as a crime of passion by connecting Birgitt with a random man who would later take the blame for the murder. For this role, Colonna suggests  Bauman, an unemployed, weak-willed man whose wife left him. Bauman's ex-wife happens to be Colonna's mistress. Upon his arrival in Munich, Bauman meets Birgitt, falls in love with her and plans to go away with her. Athanase's group proceeds with their assassination plan, but Bauman intervenes. In the ensuing shootout, Colonna is mortally wounded by Birgitt who then surrenders to the police.

Cast
 Philippe Noiret as Athanase  
 Jean Rochefort as Charles-Philippe Bauman  
 Lisa Kreuzer as Monica / Birgitt Haas  
 Bernard Le Coq as Colonna  
 Maurice Teynac as Chamrode  
 Michel Beaune as Delaunay  
 Victor Garrivier as Nader 
 Monique Chaumette as Laura  
 Christian Bouillette 
 Stephan Meldegg as Steinhof  
 Peter Chatel as Betz  
 Roland Blanche as Othenin  
 Dagmar Deisen as Gisella  
 Lucienne Hamon as Claire, la femme d'Athanase  
 Axel Ganz as Weidman

Reception
The film was only moderately successful in France and sold 949,556 tickets.

It received mixed reviews in the U.S. Vincent Canby in The New York Times called it "an espionage melodrama of startling ineptitude" and "a movie of wrong-headed solemnity." The Washington Post criticized Heynemann and his screenwriting collaborators for approaching "a shaky thriller premise in the guise of rank, soggy-sleeved sentimentalists", and added that the film "would be substantially improved if it took a cold-eyed view of its characters." The Christian Science Monitor said it was "resonant and involving much of the time, but slippery and superficial in its refusal to take a forthright stand on the issue of terrorism itself." Stanley Kauffmann in The New Republic said the film hit "the double bull's eye". In WOR-TV & The New York Journal, Judith Crist called it "an eerie, fantastic tale of undercover intrigue", and added that "three stunning performances--by Philippe Noiret, Jean Rochefort and Lisa Kreuzer--give credibility and power." Bay Area Reporter called it "a good thriller, and more compassionate than most", and concluded: "this is decidedly not one of those spy films in which people are no more than numbers; even minor characters are fleshed out into human form."

References

Bibliography 
 Rège, Philippe. Encyclopedia of French Film Directors, Volume 1. Scarecrow Press, 2009.

External links 
 

1981 films
1981 thriller films
German thriller films
West German films
1980s French-language films
Films directed by Laurent Heynemann
Films scored by Philippe Sarde
French thriller films
Cultural depictions of the Red Army Faction
Films shot in Munich
Films set in Munich
1980s French films
1980s German films